Actibacterium ureilyticum is a Gram-negative, aerobic and rod-shaped bacterium from the genus of Actibacterium  with a polar flagella which has been isolated from seawater from the South China Sea in Taiwan.

References

External links
Type strain of Actibacterium ureilyticum at BacDive -  the Bacterial Diversity Metadatabase

Rhodobacteraceae
Bacteria described in 2016